The Criminal Procedure Act 1865 (28 & 29 Vict c 18), commonly known as Denman's Act, is an Act of the Parliament of the United Kingdom.

This Act was retained for the Republic of Ireland by section 2(2)(a) of, and Part 4 of Schedule 1 to, the Statute Law Revision Act 2007.

In the Republic of Ireland, section 16 of the Criminal Justice Act 2006 is without prejudice to sections 3 to 6 of this Act.

Preamble
The preamble was repealed by the Statute Law Revision Act 1893.

Section 1 - Provisions of sect. 2. of this Act to apply to trials commenced on or after July 1, 1865
In England and Wales and Northern Ireland, this section now reads:

The words omitted were repealed for England and Wales by section 10(2) of, and Part III of Schedule 3 to, the Criminal Law Act 1967 and for Northern Ireland by Part II of Schedule 2 to the Criminal Law Act (Northern Ireland) 1967.

The words "for felony or misdemeanour" were repealed for the Republic of Ireland by section 16 of, and the Third Schedule to, the Criminal Law Act 1997.

Section 2 - Summing up of evidence in cases of felony and misdemeanor
In England and Wales and Northern Ireland, this section now reads:

The words omitted were repealed for England and Wales by section 10(2) of, and Part III of Schedule 3 to, the Criminal Law Act 1967 and for Northern Ireland by Part II of Schedule 2 to the Criminal Law Act (Northern Ireland) 1967.

The words "for felony or misdemeanour" were repealed for the Republic of Ireland by section 16 of, and the Third Schedule to, the Criminal Law Act 1997.

This section is modified by section 3 of the Criminal Evidence Act 1898, section 42(1) of the Criminal Justice Act 1948 and section 1(1) of the Criminal Procedure (Right of Reply) Act 1964.

In the Republic of Ireland, this section is restricted by section 24(1) of the Criminal Justice Act 1984.

"Counsel"

This expression is defined by section 9.

Section 3 - How far witness may be discredited by the party producing
In England and Wales and Northern Ireland, this section reads:

"Adverse"

See Greenough v Eccles (1859) 5 CB (NS) 786, (1859) 33 LT (OS) 19, (1859) 5 Jur (NS) 766 (decided under section 22 of the Common Law Procedure Act 1854).

"Inconsistent"

See Jackson v Thomason (1861) 31 LJQB 11

Section 4 - As to proof of contradictory statements of adverse witness
In England and Wales and Northern Ireland, this section reads:

Sections 4 and 5 re-enact sections 23 and 24 of the Common Law Procedure Act 1854.

Section 5 - Cross-examinations as to previous statements in writing
In England and Wales and Northern Ireland, this section reads:

This section is exactly reproduced in the Evidence Ordinance (Laws of Hong Kong c 8)

Section 7 - As to proof by attesting witnesses
This section reads:

Section 8 - As to comparison of disputed writing
This section reads:

Section 9 - "Counsel"
This section reads:

References to attorneys

In England and Wales, these must be construed as references to solicitors of the Senior Courts.

In Northern Ireland, these must be construed as references to solicitors of the Court of Judicature.

Section 10 - Not to apply to Scotland
This section provides that the Act does not apply to Scotland.

See also
Criminal Procedure Act

References
Halsbury's Statutes,

External links
The Criminal Procedure Act 1865, as amended from the National Archives.
The Criminal Procedure Act 1865, as originally enacted from the National Archives.
List of amendments and repeals in the Republic of Ireland from the Irish Statute Book.

United Kingdom Acts of Parliament 1865